Tae In-ho (born Park Sang-yeon; May 2, 1980) is a South Korean actor. He starred in television series such as Misaeng: Incomplete Life (2014) and Descendants of the Sun (2016).

Filmography

Films

Television series

Web series

References

External links
 
 

1980 births
Living people
South Korean male television actors
South Korean male film actors
South Korean male stage actors
South Korean male musical theatre actors
Kyungsung University alumni